The Churu (or Chru) people are a Chams related ethnic group living mainly in Lâm Đồng Province, Central Highlands of Vietnam. They speak Chru, a Malayo-Polynesian language. The group's population was 23,242 in 2019.

During the French colonial period, the most influential highland leaders in Đà Lạt area were Churu. They were said to be the most advanced among the highlanders because of their historical links to the Chams.

History
According to most of village elders (tha ploi) of the Churu people in Lâm Đồng, the Churu people were originally a group of close descendants of the Cham people who lived in the South Central Coast of Vietnam. In order to serve the constant wars with the Khmer and the Vietnamese, the Cham aristocracy carried out exploiting their fellow laborers very badly. They forced the laborers to go deep into the forest to find ivory, rhino horn and precious forest products or go down to the river panning gold to tribute. Forced coolie recruit, soldier recruit constantly made the life of Cham farmers very hard. To avoid that heavy oppression and exploitation, some were forced to leave their homeland to find a new land. And they were the first immigrants who gave themselves the name Churu as it is today. They were the people who brought with them rice farming and pottery making of the Cham people.

Encouraged by Touneh Hàn Đăng, the Churu adopted some economic innovations from the Chams in the fields of weaving, pottery, and plowing in 1907.

Economic Activities

Farming
The Churu are mainly residents of wet rice cultivation, unlike other Lâm Đồng indigenous residents who cultivate slash-and-burn agriculture.

The Churu have long known to turn animal husbandry into an active support for agricultural farming. Large cattle such as buffaloes, cows and horses are not only used for sacrifice but also bring benefits of plowing power and fertilizer. They also know how to make production tools such as plows (Chru: lơngar), harrows (Chru: sơkăm) out of wood or metal. 

The Churu also appreciate the importance of irrigation. The system of dams, large ditches, auxiliary ditches, leading to the fields of each family, clan, and the whole village is regularly repaired, renovated and upgraded. They often build dams by using soil, stones, and wood to block a stream or a tributary to store and actively water irrigation.

Hunting

The Churu people catch fish in several ways, one of which is pounding the roots of trees with poisonous resins and mixing them with spring water.
In the idle farming months, Churu men go to the forest to hunt animals. They have a lot of experience in making poison arrows and traps for wild animals. Animals hunted with trap or crossbow include: pig, deer, monkey, weasel and other small animals. The form of collective hunting is often organized in many villages, but hunting is no longer popular today. 

Gathering is the work of women. Wild vegetables and field vegetables make up the main part of the dishes. Bamboo shoots and some wild fruits are also commonly used foods. Dioscorea hamiltonii (Vietnamese: củ mài) are used as the main source of food in times of failed crop. The Churu also collect other forest products such as: Auricularia auricula-judae (Vietnamese: mộc nhĩ), mushrooms, honey, Wurfbainia villosa (Vietnamese: sa nhân).

Notable persons
 Po Rome, the king of Champa ruled from 1627 to 1651, who harmonized Hindu and Muslim factions, forced peace between Chams communities under his reign.
 Touneh Hàn Đăng, the chief of  Montagnard district (Vietnamese: Huyện Thượng) in Lâm Viên province under the reign of King Bảo Đại (was Đơn Dương district,  under South Vietnam period, now is Đơn Dương district, Lâm Đồng province).

References

Review of a Churu folklore book
 Chru Wordlist at the Austronesian Basic Vocabulary Database

 
Ethnic groups in Vietnam